Robert Muir may refer to:

Robert Muir (pathologist) (1864–1959), Scottish pathologist
Robert Muir (politician) (1919–2011), Canadian politician
Robbie Muir (footballer) (born 1953), Australian rules footballer
Bob Muir (coach), American swimming coach in the International Swimming Hall of Fame
Bob Muir (footballer) (1907–1973), Australian rules footballer
Bob Muir (racing driver), Australian Bathurst 1000 race car driver
Bobby Muir, Scottish footballer
Robert Andrew Muir (1821–1904), Australian merchant and politician